Levan Farm, also known as the Issac Levan Tract and Jacob Levan Farm, is a historic house and farm complex located in Exeter Township, Berks County, Pennsylvania.  The house was built in 1837, and is a two-story, five bay by two bay, stone dwelling in the Georgian style. It is built of fieldstone with light colored and red sandstone quoins.  It has a later -story rear addition.  Also on the property are a stone and wood frame bank barn, spring house, lime kilns, granary, corn crib, and wagon shed.  The Levan Farm was established by Isaac Levan about 1730 on a land grant from William Penn.

It was listed on the National Register of Historic Places in 1978.

Gallery

References

Farms on the National Register of Historic Places in Pennsylvania
Georgian architecture in Pennsylvania
Houses completed in 1837
Houses in Berks County, Pennsylvania
National Register of Historic Places in Berks County, Pennsylvania
Lime kilns in the United States